Gmina Słupia may refer to any of the following rural administrative districts in Poland:

 Gmina Słupia, Jędrzejów County
 Gmina Słupia, Łódź Voivodeship
 Gmina Słupia Konecka (formerly Słupia), Końskie County